Katwoude is a village in the province of North Holland, Netherlands. It is a part of the municipality of Waterland, and lies on the coast of the IJsselmeer, about 2 km north of Monnickendam.

The village was first mentioned in 1310 as "lant van Kattwoude". The etymology is unclear. Even though there is a cat in the shield, it is unlikely to be related to the animal.

Katwoude was home to 182 people in 1840. It used to be a separate municipality between 1817 and 1991, when it became part of Waterland. Katwoude used to share a mayor with Monnickendam.

Gallery

References

Populated places in North Holland
Former municipalities of North Holland
Waterland